The King's House on Schachen is a small villa (Schlösschen) at Schachen, Wetterstein Formation, about 10 km south of Garmisch-Partenkirchen, Bavaria, Germany, built by Ludwig II of Bavaria. The castle was constructed between 1869 and 1872.

Location
The King's House on Schachen is located at Schachen, Wetterstein Formation, about 10 km south of Garmisch-Partenkirchen, Bavaria. It can only be reached via a 10 km forest road, on a three-hour hike, ascending 1000m either from Schloss Elmau or Garmisch-Partenkirchen, which provides a view of Zugspitze amongst others.

History 

The King's House on Schachen was built between 1869 and 1872 for Ludwig II of Bavaria and designed by architect Georg von Dollmann. It is often described as a hunting lodge, though Ludwig never used it for this purpose, instead utilizing it for birthday and anniversary celebrations. The building is the least-known of the palaces built by Ludwig. One room known as the "Turkish Room" occupies the entire upper-floor of the castle, and is elaborately decorated in an Oriental fashion. The extravagant upstairs interior stands in stark contrast to the exterior and ground floor, which are rather modest.

Alpengarten auf dem Schachen  
Adjacent to the house itself is the Alpengarten auf dem Schachen on about one hectare, an alpine botanical garden at about 2000m altitude, which contains over 1,000 plant species from the Alps to the Himalayas. It is maintained by the Botanischer Garten München-Nymphenburg, open during the summer months daily from 8 am to 5 pm, admission cost 2.50 euros as of 2018. Although the Wetterstein Mountains are primarily limestone, the limestone and dolomite weather differently: dolomite decomposes into a shard and splinter debris on which some plants thrive particularly well. Lime weathers chemically, calcifications arise, in which water quickly seeps away. On the other hand, the sandstone provides for loamy and low-limestone soils that hold water well.

Altogether 42 plant beds are assigned to different geographical regions,  the flora of the Bavarian forest, the Alps, Carpathians, Patagonia, the Rocky Mountains - and the Himalayas.

References

External links 

 
King Ludwig II and his castles
 Alpengarten auf dem Schachen
Konigshaus am Schachen Story and photos of the King's House

Houses completed in 1872
Castles in Bavaria
Royal residences in Bavaria
Landmarks in Germany
Botanical gardens in Germany
Gardens in Bavaria
Garmisch-Partenkirchen
Museums in Bavaria
Historic house museums in Germany
Moorish Revival architecture in Germany
Buildings and structures in Garmisch-Partenkirchen (district)
Ludwig II of Bavaria